Richard K. Wagner is an American psychologist, having been the Alfred Binet Professor at Florida State University.

References

21st-century American psychologists
Florida State University faculty
Living people
University of Akron alumni
Yale University alumni
Year of birth missing (living people)